Deák Ferenc tér is a transfer station on the M1, M2, and M3 lines of the Budapest Metro. It is located under the eponymous city square in central Budapest, the capital city of Hungary. 
Owing to its direct transfer connection between three out of the four metro lines Budapest has and its downtown location, it is one of the busiest stations in the system.

History
The original station, on the M1 line, was constructed with two side platforms, at a depth of 2.7 metres by cut-and-cover. It was originally named Gizella tér.  It was opened on 2 May 1896 as part of the inaugural section of the Budapest Metro, between Vörösmarty tér and Széchenyi fürdő. In 1952, during the building of Line 2, a new station was built for Line 1. The old station was closed, nowadays it gives place to Underground Railway Museum.

The station for the M2 line was bored at a depth of 38 metres and consists of an island platform serving its two tracks. On 2 April 1970, the section from Deák Ferenc tér east to Örs vezér tere was open. On 22 December 1972, the line was extended west to Déli pályaudvar.

The M3 station was the northern terminus for the first segment of the line completed in 1976 and opened on 31 December 1976 to Nagyvárad tér and has switches and a pullback track in a middle tunnel at its northern end. This track descends underground and curves more than 180° west to join the pullback track on the M2 line. This non-revenue connection tunnel was the means of supplying rolling stock to line M3 from 1976 until it was completed to Kőbánya-Kispest and the adjacent new depot in 1980. The extension of the line north to Lehel tér was opened on 30 December 1981.

Tiles in the station feature poems written in Hungarian and Portuguese.

Connections
Bus: 9, 16, 100E, 105, 178, 216
Trolleybus: 72M
Tram: 47, 48, 49

Nearby landmarks
Deák Ferenc Square
Erzsébet (Elizabeth) Square
Budapest City Hall

References

External links
Deák Ferenc tér station on Youtube

M1 (Budapest Metro) stations
M2 (Budapest Metro) stations
M3 (Budapest Metro) stations
Railway stations opened in 1976